Svetlana is a comedy series starring comedian Iris Bahr. It premiered on HDNet on May 27, 2010 and ran for two seasons.

Plot
Svetlana Maximovskaya (Iris Bahr) is a woman of indeterminate age who arrived in Minnesota from the former Soviet Union as a mail-order bride. After leaving her husband Steve, she moves to Los Angeles and opens a brothel in a suburban home, the "St. Petersburg House of Discreet Pleasure".

Cast
 Iris Bahr as Svetlana Maximovskaya
 Alex Veadov as Vlad
 Angela Gots as Marina
 Irina Voronina as Natasha
 Katia Hayes as Anya

Episodes

Season 1: 2010

Season 2: 2011

External links 
 

HDNet original programming
2010s American comedy television series
2010 American television series debuts
2011 American television series endings